Nicole Brossard  (born November 27, 1943) is a French-Canadian formalist poet and novelist.  Her work is known for exploration of feminist themes and for challenging masculine-oriented language and points of view in French literature.

She lives in Outremont, a suburb of Montreal, Canada.

Early life
Brossard was born in Montreal, Quebec. She attended Collège Marguerite Bourgeoys and the Université de Montréal.

Career
Brossard wrote her first collection in 1965, Aube à la saison.  The collection L'Echo bouge beau marked a break in the evolution of her poetry that included an open and active participation in many literary and cultural events, including poetry recitals.

In 1975, she participated in a meeting of writers on women, after which she began to take an activist role in the feminist movement, and to write poetry with a more personal and subjective tone. Her writing includes sensual, aesthetic and feminist political content.

Brossard co-founded a feminist newspaper, Les têtes de pioches, with France Théoret. She wrote a play Le nef des sorcières (first performed in 1976).

In 1982, she founded a publishing house: L'Intégrale éditrice. Brossard's poetry collection, Double Impression, won the 1984 Governor General's Award.  In 1987 her romance novel, Le désert mauve, was published.

The Nicole Brossard archives are located in downtown Montreal at the Bibliothèque et Archives nationales du Québec. and at Library and Archives Canada.

In April 2019, Brossard was announced as the 2019 Griffin Lifetime Recognition Award recipient.

Awards

1974: Governor General's Award for Poetry
1984: Governor General's Award for Poetry
1991: Prix Athanase-David
1991: Harbour Festival Prize
2019: America Award in Literature for a lifetime contribution to international writing

Selected bibliography
Aube à la saison - 1965
Mordre en sa chair - 1966
L'écho bouge beau - 1968
Suite logique - 1970
Un livre - 1970 (translated in English as A Book)
Le centre blanc - 1970
Mécanique jongleuse - 1974 (translated in English as Day-Dream Mechanics; winner of the 1974 Governor General's Award for Poetry)
La partie pour le tout - 1975
Sold-Out, étreinte / illustration - (1973) 1977
L'amèr ou le Chapitre effrité - 1977(translated in English as These Our Mothers)
French kiss, étreinte / exploration - (1974) 1979
Les sens apparent - 1980 (translated in English as Surfaces of Sense)
Amantes - 1980 (translated in English as Lovhers; nominated for a Governor General's Award)
Journal intime - 1984
Double impression - 1984 (winner of the 1984 Governor General's Award for Poetry)
Domaine d'écriture - 1985
La lettre aérienne - 1985 (translated in English as The Aerial Letter)
Le désert mauve - 1987 (translated in English as Mauve Desert)
L'amer - 1988
Installations: avec sans pronoms - 1989
A tout regard - 1989
La nuit verte du parc labyrinthe - 1992
Langues obscures - 1992
Baroque d'aube - 1995 (translated in English as Baroque at Dawn)
Vertige de l'avant-scène - 1997 (nominated for a Governor General's Award)
Au présent des veins - 1999
Musée de l'os et de l'eau - 1999 (translated into English as Museum of Bone and Water; nominated for a Governor General's Award;)
Hier - 2001 (translated in English as Yesterday, at the Hotel Clarendon)
Cahier de roses & de civilisation - 2003 (nominated for a Governor General's Award)

English translations
These Our Mothers- 1983; translated by Barbara Godard
Baroque at Dawn - 1997
Museum of Bone and Water - 2005
Fluid Arguments - 2005
Yesterday, at the Hotel Clarendon - 2006
Picture Theory - 2006
Mauve Desert - 2006
Notebook of Roses and Civilization - 2007; translation by Robert Majzels and Erín Moure, shortlisted for the 2008 Canadian Griffin Poetry Prize
Fences in Breathing - 2009
Nicole Brossard: Selections - 2010; edited by Jennifer Moxley for the series: Poets for the Millennium from University of California Press
White Piano - 2013; translation by Robert Majzels and Erín Moure, shortlisted for the 2014 Best Translated Book Award

See also
Canadian literature
Canadian poetry
List of Canadian poets
List of Canadian writers
List of Quebec writers

References

Further reading

External links
Griffin Poetry Prize biography, including audio and video clips
EPC and PennSound link
The Literary Encyclopedia
  Nicole Brossard Bio
Fine Feminist Workings Susan Rudy's review of Nicole Brossard: Essays on Her Works, by Louise H. Forsyth; published by Guernica Editions in 2005
Fonds Nicole Brossard (R11718) at Library and Archives Canada

1943 births
20th-century Canadian poets
21st-century Canadian poets
Writers from Montreal
Canadian women poets
Canadian poets in French
Governor General's Award-winning poets
Living people
Prix Athanase-David winners
Officers of the Order of Canada
Harbourfront Festival Prize winners
People from Outremont, Quebec
Canadian LGBT poets
20th-century Canadian women writers
21st-century Canadian women writers
Knights of the National Order of Quebec
Canadian lesbian writers
21st-century Canadian LGBT people
20th-century Canadian LGBT people